The 1993 Vanderbilt Commodores football team represented Vanderbilt University in the 1993 NCAA Division I-A football season as a member of the Eastern Division of the Southeastern Conference (SEC). The Commodores were led by head coach Gerry DiNardo in his third season and finished with a record of five wins and six losses (5–6 overall, 2–6 in the SEC).

The 500 win milestone mark was finally made by the 1993 Vanderbilt football team. The 500th win was on October 9, 1993 against Cincinnati with a 17–7 win.

In 1995, the NCAA found Antonio Langham guilty of receiving improper benefits after signing with an agent following the 1992 season, forcing Alabama to forfeit all games in which Langham competed. Vanderbilt does not count the forfeit as a win.

Schedule

Source: 1993 Vanderbilt football schedule

Team Stats

Passing

Rushing & Receiving

Defense  

			
Kick & Punt Returns

Kicking & Punting

References

Vanderbilt
Vanderbilt Commodores football seasons
Vanderbilt Commodores football